Body Count is a 1986 Italian slasher film directed by Ruggero Deodato. The film is about a group of vacationing teenagers who enter an abandoned camp site that was formerly an Indian burial ground. One by one, the kids begin to be killed off.

The film was initially to be made by  Alessandro Capone, but directing was taken over by Deodato during production. The film's script was changed on set by screenwriter Dardano Sacchetti while production was troubled by weather in the Abruzzi region. Retrospective reviews of the film have commented that it was derivative of American slasher films of the era.

Plot

A gang of vacationing teenagers drive out to an abandoned campsite that was shut down years before, due to the murder of a young couple that occurred there. The area was formerly an old Indian burial ground and is believed to be haunted by the spirit of an Indian shaman. One by one, the kids are killed off in gruesome ways, whom they believe to be the Indian shaman returned to life.

Cast

Production
The film was shot in the Italian Abruzzi region for four weeks. Director Ruggero Deodato entered the films production to take over for Alessandro Capone  who had written the films script. Dardano Sacchetti also entered to do re-writes for the film during production. The film was plagued by a bad production, due to bad weather in the Abruzzo region

Release
Body Count was first released in 1986 and then released in Italy on May 15, 1987. Film critic and historian Roberto Curti stated that the Italian theatrical release was very brief. The film was released on home video in Australia, Holland and the United Kingdom as Body Count. In Denmark, it was released on home video as Shamen.

Critical reception 
From retrospective reviews, Adrian Luther Smith in his book on Italian giallo found that the film had a "great cast of Italian exploitation regulars to go waste in a cynical production which should never have been made." Luther Smith stated that the film score by Claudio Simonetti was "the one feature of the film everyone seems to applaud." A review from the online film database Allmovie called it a "derivative slasher entry" and "one of Deodato's least interesting films."

Deodato later spoke about the film, stating that "It's not bad. But perhaps it was more suited for a director like [Lamberto] Bava or Fulci."

References

Sources

External links
  
 

English-language Italian films
1986 horror films
1986 films
Italian slasher films
Films directed by Ruggero Deodato
Films scored by Claudio Simonetti
Films set in the United States
Native American cemeteries in popular culture
Shamanism in popular culture
1980s slasher films
1980s Italian films